Graphosia phaeocraspis is a moth of the family Erebidae. It was described by George Thomas Bethune-Baker in 1908. It is found in New Guinea.

References

External links
 Natural History Museum Lepidoptera generic names catalog

Lithosiina
Moths described in 1908